Admiral Sir Henry Prescott  (4 May 1783 – 18 November 1874) was an officer of the British Royal Navy who served during the French Revolutionary and Napoleonic Wars, and was later the Governor of the Newfoundland Colony.

Biography

Family background
Prescott was born at Kew Green, Surrey, the son of Admiral Isaac Prescott and a daughter of the Reverend Richard Walter, who served as chaplain aboard the  during Commodore George Anson's expedition to the Pacific, and was the author of A Voyage Round the World, in the Years 1740–44 (1748). Prescott's only brother, an infantry officer in the East India Company's service, was drowned during a voyage home in 1806.

Junior officer
Prescott entered the Navy on 16 February 1796 as first-class volunteer on board the 98-gun ship of the line , serving under Captains the Honourable George Cranfield Berkeley and John Irwin, stationed in the Channel. He was rated as a midshipman in April 1797, and in early 1798 followed Admiral Sir Charles Thompson (whose flag had been flying on board Formidable) into the 100-gun .

He afterwards took part in the Egyptian Campaign of 1801; and on 17 February 1802, while serving under Lord Keith in the 80-gun ship , was appointed acting-lieutenant of the brig , Captain James Prevost, and his commission was confirmed on 28 April 1802. He then served on the frigate , Captain Lucius Ferdinand Hardyman, in the North Sea from 26 April 1803. On 14 December 1804 he moved to the frigate , Captain Lord William FitzRoy, seeing action in the Battle of Cape Ortegal on 4 November 1805, when a squadron under Sir Richard Strachan fought four ships escaped from Trafalgar. He subsequently served aboard Lord Eldon, Captain George B. Whinyates; the 74-gun , Captain Henry Blackwood; and the 98-gun , flagship of Lord Collingwood, all in the Mediterranean.

Commander
On 4 February 1808 he was promoted to commander in the 18-gun brig . On 1 April off Sardinia, he fell in with a French fleet of ten ships of the line, three frigates, a brig, and a store-ship, and after making a reconnaissance on the next day, sailed to report their position to Collingwood, who was cruising with a more powerful force near Sicily. Unfortunately, adverse winds prevented Collingwood from intercepting the French before they reached the safety of Toulon. While employed on the coast of Naples, Prescott was employed in attacking coastal traffic. He first drove a French 20-gun brig to seek refuge under shore batteries. He attempted to entice her out, and although she was supported by 11 Neapolitan gun-boats, she refused. On 8 September 1808 he contributed to the capture of four large gunboats and 34 coasting vessels assembled at Diamante near the Gulf of Policastro, which he blockaded until the arrival from Sicily of a force sufficient to capture them. On 27 October 1809 he captured the French letter of marque Veloce, of 4 guns and 83 men; and on 25 December, after a chase of nine hours and an action lasting one and a half hours, the polacre rigged privateer Eole of 14 guns and 140 men, five of whom were killed and nine wounded, with a loss of only one man killed and one wounded. Between then and June 1810, Weazel was employed off Sardinia, where she took and re-captured 17 vessels, including the French privateer schooner Ippolite, of 5 guns and 78 men. She next took part in the defence of Sicily, coming into frequent contact with the flotilla equipped by Joachim Murat for his attempted invasion of the island. On 25 July 1810 Weazel, the frigate , and the 18-gun brig-sloop , forced a convoy of 31 vessels, protected by seven large gunboats and five scampavias, to seek refuge at Amantea, under the protection of two shore batteries. Prescott led in the boats of the three British ships, and despite heavy enemy fire, captured or destroyed all the vessels. The following month he twice engaged convoys, and captured six vessels, although he was obliged to abandon two — an armed xebec and a gunboat — as a sudden shift of wind direction, and the Weazles mainyard being shot away, it became impossible for her to tow them out from under a shore battery. In 1847 a clasp to the Naval General Service Medal "Amanthea 25 July 1810" was awarded to any surviving claimants from the action of that day.

Post-captain and Governor
He was rewarded for his actions at Amantea by receiving promotion to post-captain with seniority backdated to 25 July 1810, but did not leave Weazle until February 1811. He was appointed to command of the 20-gun sloop  on 7 August 1811 off the Channel Islands. On 3 June 1813 he took command of the frigate  and was employed in the Bay of Biscay until April 1815. He was made a Companion of the Order of the Bath on 4 June 1815.

He returned to sea duty on 6 April 1821 in command of the 46-gun frigate  as senior officer on the coast of Brazil and also spent 18 months in the Pacific protecting British interests during the Spanish American wars of independence. In 1822 the Congress of Peru demanded a contribution from the merchants of Lima, the British proportion amounting to nearly 200,000 dollars. Prescott not only protested, but took measures such that the Congress abandoned the idea. As a mark of their respect and gratitude, the British merchants at Lima voted the sum of 1,500 dollars to buy him a testimonial. In February 1825 he returned to England.

On 24 September 1834 Prescott was appointed Governor and Commander-in-Chief of Newfoundland and its dependencies,  He arrived in St John's in November, into a turbulent situation riven by political and religious acrimony. Prescott attempted to mediate between the opposing factions, but could make few decisions without angering one or the other. He attempted to resign in January 1839, but this was not accepted. Prescott finally resigned in May 1841. Despite the difficulties he made several improvements; passing an education act, which created the first non-denominational elementary schools, appointing road commissioners to improve transport, and encouraging agriculture. Prescott was not a trained administrator, but made several suggestions to improve the governance of the colony.

Prescott Street in St. John's is named for Henry Prescott.

Admiral
Prescott was awarded the Captain's Good Service Pension on 1 April 1844, and was promoted to rear admiral on 24 April 1847, serving on the Board of Admiralty as Second Naval Lord from 20 July before being appointed Admiral-Superintendent at Portsmouth Naval Dockyard on 15 December and serving there until 1852.

He was promoted to vice-admiral on 1 May 1854, made a Knight Commander of the Order of the Bath on 5 February 1856, promoted to admiral on 11 May 1860, officially retiring from the Navy on 9 June 1860.

He was made a Knight Grand Cross of the Order of the Bath on 2 June 1869, and for a time was Justice of the Peace for Surrey.

He died at his home No. 7 Leinster Gardens, Bayswater, London, on 18 November 1874, and is buried at Kensal Green Cemetery.

Personal life
On 5 July 1815 he married Mary Anne Charlotte, the eldest daughter of Vice-Admiral Philippe d'Auvergne, and had
several children. His son, the Reverend Isaac Philip Prescott (d. 1898) married Caroline Mary Parke, daughter of Captain Edward Parke, RN, in 1842, and served as rector of Kelly, Devon. His daughter Henrietta (d. 1875), married Admiral Sir Stephen Lushington, and was the author of Poems, written in Newfoundland (1839) and The Sea Spirit and Other Poems (1850). His second daughter Catherine married Louis Diston Powles.

See also 
 List of people of Newfoundland and Labrador

References

|-

1783 births
1874 deaths
People from Kew, London
Royal Navy personnel of the French Revolutionary Wars
Royal Navy personnel of the Napoleonic Wars
Governors of Newfoundland Colony
Royal Navy admirals
Lords of the Admiralty
Knights Grand Cross of the Order of the Bath
Burials at Kensal Green Cemetery